Gravity Crash is a multidirectional shooter released on the PlayStation Network. Its visual style pays homage to arcade games of the 1980s. A PlayStation Vita port was released in August 2014 under the title Gravity Crash Ultra.

Gameplay

The player chooses a planet to visit from a top-level menu, and explores that planet in a two-dimensional side view. The planetary surfaces tend to be riddled with systems of caverns: manoeuvring through them while taking gravity into account is one of the game's principal challenges. Gravity Crash was inspired by three games in particular, Gravitar, Thrust and Oids.

The player can choose one of two control modes: in the first, the player's craft can fire only in the direction it is currently facing. In the second, the direction of fire is independent of the craft's orientation, controlled by the second joystick on the controller.

As an extra the game includes a shooting mini-game titled Gold Grabber, which is similar to the arcade game Robotron: 2084.

Soundtrack
The game features music by video game musician Tim Wright, who composed a 16-track remix album and double 'A'-side single to complement the game.

Reception
Gravity Crash received mostly positive reviews.  Play's reviewer stated that the only bad thing was the "insane difficulty level." Edge's reviewer also mentioned the difficulty, calling Gravity Crash "A stern, if unspectacular, challenge."

References

External links
 Just Add Water website

2009 video games
Multidirectional shooters
Multiplayer and single-player video games
PlayStation 3 games
PlayStation Network games
PlayStation Portable games
PlayStation Vita games
Sony Interactive Entertainment games
Video games scored by Tim Wright (Welsh musician)
Video games developed in the United Kingdom
Video games set on fictional planets